Mount Spokane [elevation ]—previously known as Mount Baldy until 1912 due to its pronounced bald spot—is a mountain in the northwest United States, located northeast of Spokane, Washington. Its summit is the highest point in Spokane County, and it is one of the tallest peaks in the Inland Northwest. Mount Spokane is surrounded by Mount Spokane State Park, Washington's largest  One of the well-known features is a bald spot on the corner of the west and south parts of the mountain.

Mount Kit Carson—the second highest peak in Spokane County—is located only  to the east, and with a topographic prominence of only  could be considered a satellite peak of Mount Spokane.

A non-profit organization operates the Mount Spokane Ski and Snowboard Park, located on the southwest portion of the mountain.

Climate

Gallery

References

External links 

 
 

Spokane, Mount
Parks in Spokane County, Washington
State parks of Washington (state)
Mountains of Spokane County, Washington